Abdulrahman al-Nuaimi (1943/1944 – September 1, 2011) was a Bahraini politician and opposition leader. Al-Nuaimi, who spent more than thirty years in self-imposed exile from Bahrain, founded some of the country's most important political opposition groups.

He was born in 1944 on Muharraq island to the Sunni Al Nuaim family that has close ties to the traditional ruling circles. In the 1960s, he became increasingly politically active and joined the Arab Nationalist Movement. In 1966, he graduated from the American University of Beirut with a degree in mechanical engineering.

He founded the Popular Front for the Liberation of Bahrain (PFLB), a resistance group, during the 1970s. The groups was inspired by the Arab Nationalist Movement which was sweeping though the Arab World at the time.

After a crackdown on the workers' movements at the power station where he was working in 1968, he left Bahrain to live in exile, spending 33 years in Damascus.

In 2001, al-Nuaimi returned to Bahrain from abroad and re-entered politics. He founded the National Democratic Action Society (NDA), Bahrain's largest leftist political party, with members of the former PFLB.

The NDA is also known as the Wa'ad party. Al-Nuaimi ran for a seat in the Council of Representatives of Bahrain during the 2006 parliamentary election, but lost to a pro-candidate candidate by a small margin.

Abdulrahman al-Nuaimi suffered from deteriorating health in the mid-2000s. He fell into a coma in April 2007. He was succeeded as head of the National Democratic Action Society by Ibrahim Sharif. Al-Nuaimi remained in a coma until his death on September 1, 2011, aged 67.

His successor as head of the National Democratic Action Society, Ibrahim Sharif, was sentenced to five years in prison in June 2011 following the 2011 Bahraini protests as part of a crackdown on opposition leaders.

References

1940s births
2011 deaths
Bahraini Arab nationalists
Bahraini dissidents
Bahraini exiles
Bahraini left-wing activists
Bahraini politicians
Bahraini Sunni Muslims
National Democratic Action Society politicians